Bahgwal Dargahi is a village in kalyam Awan with a population of about 600 persons. The country mainly depends on agriculture.

Villages in Gujar Khan Tehsil